"Why'd You Come in Here Lookin' Like That" is a song written by Bob Carlisle and Randy Thomas, and recorded by American country music artist Dolly Parton.  It was released in April 1989 as the first single from the album White Limozeen.  The song was Parton's 22nd number one on the country chart.  The single went to number one for one week and spent a total of 20 weeks on the country chart.

Parton performed the song (along with the title track to the album) when she hosted Saturday Night Live on April 15, 1989.

The song has also been recorded as a duet by Jill Johnson and Nina Persson, released on the 2007 Jill Johnson cover album Music Row, which received much SR P4 airplay.

Personnel
Mark Casstevens, Steve Gibson, Albert Lee — guitar
Mike Brignardello — bass
Eddie Bayers — drums
Barry Beckett — piano
Béla Fleck – banjo
Jo-El Sonnier — Cajun accordion
Ricky Skaggs — acoustic guitar, mandolin, fiddle, triangle, harmony vocals
Curtis Young — harmony vocals

Chart performance

Year-end charts

References 

1989 singles
Columbia Records singles
Jill Johnson songs
Dolly Parton songs
Songs written by Bob Carlisle
1989 songs
Songs written by Randy Thomas (musician)
Song recordings produced by Ricky Skaggs